The men's masters 800 metres at the 2015 World Championships in Athletics was a special demonstration event held at the Beijing National Stadium on 29 August.

From the gun WMA M55 Champion Anselm Lebourne, the oldest athlete in the field, seemed to go out slightly faster than everybody else, but a last moment burst at the break line put home town favorite Chunsheng Wang into the early lead.  By the end of the straightaway, he was  overtaken by new M50 1500 metres world record holder David Heath.  Through the turn Michael Sherar was able to work his way around Wang and Lebourne tried to follow, but tripped and spent several strides trying to regain his balance.  Wang entered the home stretch a bit wide giving Lebourne an opening to squeeze through.  Heath hit the bell at 59.73 two seconds up, with Lebourne just passing Sherar to take over second place.  1988 Olympian Paul Osland led the rest of the field past Wang along the back stretch while Lebourne separated from pack now more than 20 metres behind Heath who hit 600 metres at 1:28.57.  Onto the home stretch, Heath looked powerful way ahead of the field.  Lebourne began to struggle, ten metres out from the finish line, Gunnar Rune Durén went by, then Sherar dipped by a step before the finish line for bronze.

Lebourne's time of 2:03.75 fully automatic time is technically better than Stan Immelmann's hand timed 2:03.7 M55 world record from January 2001.  Lebrun ran 2:02.16, a significantly faster time, indoors in February.  As of December 2015, WMA has not ratified Lebourne for the world record, USATF ratified his 2:04.79 performance in Lyon as the American record.

Schedule

Results

References

Events at the 2015 World Championships in Athletics